Hong Kong China Ferry Terminal is a ferry terminal, located at China Hong Kong City, 33 Canton Road, Tsim Sha Tsui, Kowloon, Hong Kong. It is one of three cross-border ferry terminals in Hong Kong.

The pier has operated since 8 October 1988. It operates 06:00–22:00 Monday–Friday, and 06:00–02:00 Saturday, Sunday, and public holidays. It provides ferry services to Macau and mainland China.

The ferry terminal, including ferry routes, was temporarily suspended from 30 January 2020 until further notice, due to the COVID-19 pandemic.

Routes
Several ferry companies operate routes that depart from the China Ferry Terminal, including:

 Chu Kong Passenger Transport (CKS), which operates services to Zhuhai, Zhongshan, Shunde, Panyu, Jiangmen, Dongguan, Heshan, Gaoming, Kaiping, Taishan, Doumen and Zhaoqing in mainland China.
 Panyu Nansha Port Passenger Transport Company, which operates a 1h15-minute catamaran service to Nansha in mainland China.
 Cotai Jet, which operates a 1-hour service to Taipa Ferry Terminal
 TurboJET, with ferries every 30 minutes to Macau Outer Harbour Ferry Terminal.

See also
 Hong Kong–Macau Ferry Terminal
 Tuen Mun Ferry Pier—The third cross-border ferry terminal in Hong Kong

References

External links 

Piers in Hong Kong
Tsim Sha Tsui
Ferry terminals in Hong Kong
1988 establishments in Hong Kong